Musaabad (also Romanized as Mūsáābād, Mūsā Ābād, and Mūsábbād) is a village in Musaabad Rural District, in the Central District of Dehaqan County, Isfahan Province, Iran. At the 2006 census, its population was 3,628, in 1,077 families.

References 

Populated places in Dehaqan County